Asif Iqbal Razvi (Urdu: آصف اقبال رضوی, born 6 June 1943) is a former Pakistani professional cricketer who captained the Pakistan national cricket team and Kent County Cricket Club. He went on to become a match referee.

Born in Hyderabad, Asif Iqbal is related to former India captain Ghulam Ahmed and Indian tennis star Sania Mirza. He played as an all-rounder who batted right-handed batsman and bowled right-arm medium pace deliveries.

Asif played domestically for Hyderabad, Karachi, Kent, National Bank of Pakistan and Pakistan International Airlines. After learning his cricket in Hyderabad, India, he emigrated to Pakistan in 1961, where he opened the bowling with swing bowling before concentrating on batting that was noted for its footwork and cavalier cover-driving. In 1977, he played in World Series Cricket competition for the World XI side.

Asif's Test match debut was against Australia in Karachi in the 1964–1965 series during a match in which he batted at number 10. After developing back problems, Asif began to focus on his batting and gradually worked his way up Pakistan's batting order.

In the series against England in 1967, Asif scored his maiden Test century, making 146 runs batting at number 9 at The Oval, sharing in a then Test record partnership for the ninth wicket with Intikhab Alam. This was also the then highest score by a number 9 batsman in Test matches in England (until exceeded by Stuart Broad in 2010). According to Wisden, when he reached his hundred: "An amazing scene followed. Hundreds of Pakistanis raced to the wicket and hoisted Asif shoulder high. The game was held up for five minutes and when a squad of police rescued him, the poor fellow was bruised and battered". In 1968 he was named one of the Wisden Cricketers of the Year and captained Pakistan at the 1975 and 1979 Cricket World Cups, leading the team to the semi-finals in 1979.  At Test level, he captained Pakistan team in a six Test series against India in 1979/80 before retiring from Test cricket after 58 matches.

With Kent he was part of a successful side which won both the County Championship and the Benson and Hedges Cup in 1978, and the Benson and Hedges Cup in 1973 and 1976, Asif winning the man of the match award for an all-round performance in the 1973 final. He was also man of the match, although appearing on the losing side, in the Gillette Cup final of 1971.

References

External links 
 

1943 births
Living people
Pakistani people of Hyderabadi descent
Pakistani cricketers
Pakistan Test cricket captains
Pakistan One Day International cricketers
Pakistan Test cricketers
Pakistani cricket captains
Pakistani emigrants to the United Kingdom
Kent cricket captains
Kent cricketers
World Series Cricket players
Wisden Cricketers of the Year
Cricketers at the 1975 Cricket World Cup
Cricketers at the 1979 Cricket World Cup
Cricketers from Hyderabad, India
Recipients of the Pride of Performance
Karachi cricketers
Karachi A cricketers
Karachi Blues cricketers
Karachi Whites cricketers
National Bank of Pakistan cricketers
Sindh cricketers
Hyderabad cricketers
Pakistan Eaglets cricketers
South Zone cricketers
Indian emigrants to Pakistan
Pakistan International Airlines A cricketers
Pakistan International Airlines B cricketers
Pakistan International Airlines cricketers